Bignay is a barangay in Valenzuela City, Philippines. It was named after a tree called bignay or Antidesma bunius that is plentiful in the area.

Demographics
 Area: 268.8
 Population: 22,423
 Households: 5,017

Education
 Bignay National High School 
 Roberta De Jesus Elementary School
 Divine Mercy Academy
 Disiplina Village Bignay Elementary School
 Disiplina Village Bignay High School

References

Barangays of Metro Manila
Valenzuela, Metro Manila